Charles Tufton, 10th Earl of Thanet (10 September 1770 – 20 April 1832) was an English nobleman. He became Earl of Thanet on 24 January 1825, on the death of his elder brother Sackville Tufton, 9th Earl of Thanet. He was hereditary High Sheriff of Westmorland from 1825 to 1832.

He died 20 April 1832, aged 61. The title passed to his brother Henry Tufton, 11th Earl of Thanet

References

1770 births
1832 deaths
High Sheriffs of Westmorland
Earls of Thanet